Baltinava is a village in Balvi Municipality in the Latgale region of Latvia.

References
Latvijas pagasti. Enciklopēdija. A/S Preses nams, Rīga, 2001-2002 

Latvijas Republikas topogrāfiskā karte. Mērogs 1:50 000. Latvijas Ģeotelpiskās informācijas aģentūra. Rīga

Towns and villages in Latvia
Balvi Municipality
Lyutsinsky Uyezd
Latgale